The Speaker of the Legislative Assembly of Queensland is elected by the members of the Queensland Legislative Assembly to preside over sittings of the Assembly and to maintain orderly proceedings. The Speaker must be a member of the Legislative Assembly. The position is currently held by Curtis Pitt, a former Treasurer of Queensland who was elected to the post on 13 February 2018.

Election
The Legislative Assembly must choose a new Speaker when it meets following a general election. The member with the longest period of continuous service presides during the election, which is conducted by secret ballot. The Government party nominates one of its own to serve as Speaker, and that nominee is likely to win since the party typically has a majority of the seats. If the office of Speaker falls vacant, for whatever reason, the Assembly must immediately elect a replacement. The Speaker remains in office "for all purposes" following a dissolution of Parliament until the day before the first day of the new Parliament, even if the Speaker was not a candidate for re-election or lost re-election.

Role
As the chief presiding officer of the Legislative Assembly, the Speaker is expected to be impartial in chairing debates and ensuring orderly conduct in the Chamber. When in the chair, the Speaker may only vote in the case of a tie, i.e. a casting vote. Unlike Speakers in many other Westminster system parliaments, when the Deputy Speaker or another member is in the chair, the Speaker may participate in debates and cast a deliberative vote. This is especially important in hung parliaments.

The Speaker is responsible for issuing writs for state by-elections, warrants for parliamentary privilege offenders and bringing before the bar of the Parliament such offenders for rebuke or sentence. Among the office's ceremonial duties are representing the Legislative Assembly to the Crown (as by, for instance, presenting the Address in Reply to the Throne Speech) and to entities outside Parliament.

Administratively, the Speaker has control of the Parliamentary Service and is responsible for the Parliament's budget, services, and administration.

Deputies
"As soon as practicable" after first meeting, the House must choose a member to serve as Deputy Speaker and Chairperson of Committees; in recent practice, the Premier moves the appointment of the Deputy Speaker without debate or opposition as the first matter of business on the second day of the Parliament. As with the Speaker, the House must immediately fill a vacancy in the office. Like the Speaker, the Deputy Speaker remains in office after a dissolution of Parliament until the day before the next Parliament convenes even if the deputy speaker loses re-election or did not run for reelection.

The role of Deputy Speaker is created by the Standing Orders of the Legislative Assembly, and that of Chairperson of Committees by section 17(1) of the Parliament of Queensland Act 2001. As Deputy Speaker, the member takes the chair when the Speaker is absent or at his or her request. When the House resolves into a Committee of the Whole, the Chairperson must take the chair. The current Deputy Speaker is Joe Kelly.

The Speaker also appoints up to eight Temporary Speakers who take the chair in the absence or at the request of the Speaker or Deputy Speaker. The Speaker may also dismiss members of the panel of Temporary Speakers. When in the chair, Temporary Speakers are referred to as “Deputy Speaker”.

When the Speaker is absent for a sitting day, the Deputy Speaker acts as Speaker and chooses a Temporary Speaker to act as Deputy Speaker during the Speaker's absence. If the Speaker and Deputy Speaker are both absent, the House must choose a member to act as Speaker for that day. This occurred most recently during 2020 when Speaker Pitt and Deputy Speaker Stewart (both regional MPs unable to travel due to COVID-19 restrictions) were absent and Temporary Speaker Joe Kelly was chosen by the House to act in their stead.

List of Speakers

References

Sources
 
  Last updated 15 November 2011.
 Parliament of Queensland Act 2001.

Queensland